Mynes katharina , is a medium-sized butterfly of the family Nymphalidae endemic to the Bismarck Archipelago (New Hanover, New Ireland, New Britain).

References

 

Nymphalini
Butterflies described in 1898